John Paul Pizzarelli Jr. (born April 6, 1960) is an American jazz guitarist and vocalist. He has recorded over twenty solo albums and has appeared on more than forty albums by other recording artists, including Paul McCartney, James Taylor, Rosemary Clooney; his father, jazz guitarist Bucky Pizzarelli; and his wife, singer Jessica Molaskey.

Early life
The son of swing guitarist Bucky Pizzarelli, John Pizzarelli was born in Paterson, New Jersey. He started on guitar when he was six and played trumpet through his college years. He attended Don Bosco Preparatory High School, an all-boys Catholic school. In his teens, he performed with Benny Goodman, Les Paul, Zoot Sims, Slam Stewart, and Clark Terry.

Pizzarelli attended the University of Tampa and William Paterson University, though he has said that his most important teacher was his father from 1980 to 1990. During the 1980s, he established himself as a jazz guitarist and a vocalist. He released his debut solo album, I'm Hip (Please Don't Tell My Father), in 1983.

Career
During the 1990s, Pizzarelli played in a trio with Ray Kennedy and Martin Pizzarelli, his younger brother. In 1993, the trio was the opening act for Frank Sinatra, in Las Vegas, when his manager Ken Greengrass made the introduction. Pizzarelli fired Greengrass shortly thereafter. Four years later, Pizzarelli starred in Dream, a Broadway show devoted to the music of Johnny Mercer. He has named Nat King Cole as the inspiration for his career and honors that influence in the albums Dear Mr. Cole (BMG, 1994) and P.S. Mr. Cole (RCA, 1999). He has also recorded tribute albums to Frank Sinatra, Duke Ellington, Antônio Carlos Jobim, Richard Rodgers, and Paul McCartney. He and his father accompanied Annie Ross on her album To Lady with Love (Red Anchor, 2014), a tribute to Billie Holiday that Ross recorded when she was eighty-four.

He has hosted a national radio show, Radio Deluxe with John Pizzarelli, with his wife, singer and actress Jessica Molaskey. Other musicians he has worked with include George Shearing, Rosemary Clooney, Johnny Frigo, Buddy DeFranco, the Clayton-Hamilton Jazz Orchestra, the Boston Pops Orchestra, and the Cincinnati Pops Orchestra.

He sang the 1999 big-band jingle for Foxwoods Resort Casino, titled "The Wonder of It All."

Pizzarelli was a co-producer of the James Taylor album American Standard, which was nominated for a Grammy in the category of "Best Traditional Pop Vocal Album" on November 24, 2020.

Personal life
Pizzarelli's father died on April 1, 2020, from complications to COVID-19. Pizzarelli's mother died one week later on April 8, 2020.

Discography

As leader/co-leader 
 I'm Hip (Please Don't Tell My Father) (Stash, 1983)
 Hit That Jive, Jack! (Stash, 1985)
 Sing! Sing! Sing! (Stash, 1987)
 My Blue Heaven (Chesky, 1990)
 All of Me (Novus, 1992)
 Naturally (Novus, 1993)
 New Standards (Novus, 1994)
 Dear Mr. Cole (Novus, 1994)
 After Hours (RCA, 1996)
 Let's Share Christmas (RCA, 1996)
 Our Love Is Here to Stay (RCA, 1997)
 Meets the Beatles (RCA, 1998)
 P.S. Mr. Cole (RCA, 1999)
 Kisses in the Rain (Telarc, 2000)
 Let There Be Love (Telarc, 2000)
 The Rare Delight of You (Telarc, 2002)
 Live at Birdland (Telarc, 2003)
 Bossa Nova (Telarc, 2004)
 Knowing You (Telarc, 2005)
 Just Friends (Mel Bay, 2006) with Rick Haydon – recorded in 2005
 Dear Mr. Sinatra (Telarc, 2006) – recorded in 2005
 With a Song in My Heart (Telarc, 2008)
 Rockin' in Rhythm: A Tribute to Duke Ellington (Telarc, 2010)
 Double Exposure (Telarc, 2012) with Tessa Souter – recorded live at Birdland in 2011
 John Pizzarelli Salutes Johnny Mercer: Live at Birdland (Vector, 2015) – recorded in 2014
 Midnight McCartney (Concord, 2015)
 Sinatra & Jobim @ 50 (Concord, 2017)
 For Centennial Reasons: 100 Year Salute to Nat King Cole (Ghostlight, 2019)
 Better Days Ahead: Solo Guitar Takes on Pat Metheny (Ghostlight, 2021)

With Bucky Pizzarelli
 Nirvana, Bucky Pizzarelli (Delta, 1995)
 Contrasts (Arbors, 1999)
 Twogether (Victrola, 2001)
 Around the World in 80 Years, Bucky Pizzarelli (Victoria, 2006)
 Generations (Arbors, 2007)
 Sunday at Pete's, The Pizzarelli Boys (Challenge, 2007)
 Pizzarelli Party, Arbors All Stars (Arbors, 2009)
 Diggin' Up Bones, Bucky Pizzarelli (Arbors, 2009)
 Desert Island Dreamers, The Pizzarelli Boys (Arbors, 2010)
 Back in the Saddle Again, Bucky Pizarelli (Arbors, 2010)
 Passionate Guitars (2010)
 Family Fugue  (Arbors, 2011)

With Jessica Molaskey
 Pentimento (Image, 2002)
 A Good Day (PS Classics, 2003)
 Make Believe (PS Classics, 2004)
 Sitting in Limbo (PS Classics, 2007)
 A Kiss to Build a Dream On (Arbors, 2008)

As Record Producer or co-producer
With James Taylor and Dave O'Donnell
 American Standards (Fantasy Records, 2020)

As sideman or guest 
With Monty Alexander
 My America (Telarc, 2002)

With Harry Allen
 Are You Having Any Fun? (Audiophile Records, 1994)
 Harry Allen Meets John Pizzarelli Trio (BMG, 1996)
 Tenors Anyone? (Slider, 2004)

With Sam Arlen
 Arlen Plays Arlen: The Timeless Tribute to Harold Arlen (Arbors, 2005)

With Debby Boone
 Reflections of Rosemary (Concord Records, 2005)
With Cheryl Bentyne
 The Book of Love (Telarc, 2006)
With Ray Brown
 Some of My Best Friends Are...Guitarists (Telarc, 2002)
With Rosemary Clooney
 Do You Miss New York? (Concord Records, 1993)
 Brazil (Concord Records, 2000)
With Kristin Chenoweth
 A Lovely Way to Spend Christmas (Sony, 2008)
With Buddy DeFranco
 Cookin' the Books (Arbors, 2004)
With Karen Egert
 That Thing Called Love (2007)
With Johnny Frigo
 Live from Studio A in New York City (Chesky Records, 1989)
With Natalie Cole
 Stardust (Elektra Records, 1996)
With Sara Gazarek
 Blossom & Bee (Palmetto Records, 2012)
With Stephane Grappelli
 Live at the Blue Note (Telarc, 1995)
With Skitch Henderson and Bucky Pizzarelli
 Legends (Arbors, 2003)
With Hilary Kole
 Haunted Heart
With Erich Kunzel
 Got Swing! (Telarc, 2002)
 Christmastime Is Here (Telarc, 2006)
With The Manhattan Transfer
 Vibrate (Telarc, 2004)
With Paul McCartney
 Kisses on the Bottom (Hear Music, 2012)
With Jane Monheit
 Home (2010)
With Rickie Lee Jones
 It's Like This (Artemis Records, 2000)
With Donnie O'Brien
 Meets Manhattan Swing in a Basie Mood (Arbors, 2003)
With Curtis Stigers
 Real Emotional (Concord, 2007)
With James Taylor
 October Road (Sony, 2002)
 A Christmas Album (Hallmark Cards, 2004)
 James Taylor at Christmas (Columbia Records, 2006)
 American Standards (Fantasy Records, 2020)
With Aaron Weinstein
 A Handful of Stars (Arbors, 2005)

References

External links
 Official website
 Radio Deluxe with John Pizzarelli
 Live performance photographs May 15, 2006, Jazz Alley, Seattle

1960 births
Living people
American jazz guitarists
American jazz singers
American jazz songwriters
American people of Italian descent
Chesky Records artists
Novus Records artists
RCA Records artists
Telarc Records artists
Concord Records artists
Don Bosco Preparatory High School alumni
Musicians from Paterson, New Jersey
Guitarists from New Jersey
Singers from New Jersey
Swing guitarists
Swing singers
Seven-string guitarists
20th-century American guitarists
21st-century American guitarists
20th-century American male musicians
21st-century American male musicians